SAM 935 is a portable radiation detection and identification device. It uses gamma spectroscopy with room temperature NaI detectors, and QCC, Quadratic Compression Conversion, algorithms to identify multiple isotopes in realtime and below background (it subtracts the background). The SAM, surveillance and monitoring, is able to capture even transient phenomenon such as in portal situations because it captures spectra in short time segments and produces a response from spectra with each time segment. Conversely, if the SAM is in a moving vehicle, it can quickly scan an area as the vehicle moves. The first line responder can email the SAM 935 data report for further analysis.

An upgrade to the SAM 935, the SAM 940, uses a LaBr3 detector that has better resolution than a NaI detector. Additionally, the SAM 940 offers one-hand operation and a better display. An advantage of LaBr is clearly seeing the gamma and x- ray peaks of plutonium. The one highly penetrating NaI peak of Pu239 is now clearly separated into three easily recognized peaks with LaBr. The first line responder can email the SAM 940 data report (complete with GPS data, ANSI N42.42 compliant) for further analysis.

References
 Wiley Interscience "Delineation of radioactive contaminants using expedited field characterization equipment"
 http://www.iop.org/EJ/abstract/0952-4746/27/3A/S04 "Development and use of radiation detection technology for buried seabed particles" which uses a remotely operated vehicle
 https://voa.marad.dot.gov/programs/ns_savannah/docs/Character_Survey_Report/NSS_Char_Rpt_App_P%20Pg%20724-735.pdf "Radiological Sampling and Gamma Scans Aboard the N/S SAVANNAH"
 http://www.health-physics.com/pt/re/healthphys/abstract.00004032-200302001-00012.htm;jsessionid=LvdYRmY23J6PnyQJSmMlJchQznhK1JMbghdpDm5zpsqCwgXL1XsZ!-1052912739!181195629!8091!-1"Worker and Environmental Protection Issues in the Remediation Of an Abandoned Source Manufacturing Facility."
 RKB SAM 935 Page --  https://www.rkb.us/contentdetail.cfm?content_id=102281

The SAM 935 and SAM 940 are a pair of instruments utilized to search, detect, identify, and quantify gamma radiation.  These instruments are typically utilized in the field; however, some emergency response agencies incorporate these and other instruments into emergency response vehicles designed to monitor events such as the Super Bowl, World Series, and political conventions.

Typically, the users of the equipment are trained, educated, and highly specialized operatives from the City, State, or Federal Agencies.  The equipment is monitored, evaluated, and calibrated monthly when necessary.  It is common for agencies such as fire, and police agencies to create job aids when training current employees, or placing the equipment under new ownership as department duties change.

Particle detectors